Shortlanesend (meaning end of the lane) is a village in Kenwyn parish, Cornwall, England. The name was recorded as Penfounder in 1547. Shortlanesend is in the former Carrick District. The village has a pub, the Old Plough Inn, and a post office and school.

Allet is a hamlet one mile west of Shortlanesend on the B3284 Truro to Chiverton Cross road. The name was recorded as Aled in 1284. The Cornwall Wildlife Trust is based at Allet: its headquarters and offices are adjacent to the Trust's Five Acres nature reserve. This reserve includes two ponds, as well as mixed broadleaved woodland.

References

External links

Villages in Cornwall